Vingtaine du Coin Motier is one of the five vingtaines of St Lawrence Parish on the Channel Island of Jersey.

References

Coin Motier
Motier
Jersey articles needing attention